The 2011 African Nations Championship was the second edition of the African Nations Championship tournament. Each participating nation was represented mostly  by players who play in their respective local divisions. The competition was hosted in Sudan from February 4 to 25, 2011. Tunisia won their first title by defeating Angola in the final 3–0.

Qualified nations

Venues

Squads

Draw

 The Final draw for the Groups was held on Saturday November 27, 2010 in Khartoum. The 16 teams were split into four pots, with Pot 1 containing the top four seeded nations. Sudan are seeded as hosts and Congo DR as reigning holders. Ghana and Senegal have the two strongest records and so they complete the top seeded for  Pot 1. A draw will then be done to determine which of these two countries shall be awarded the letter B1 and which one will have the letter D1 . 
The remaining twelve countries was categorized into three hats according to the following criteria in order of priority:
 Results in the 1st Edition CHAN 2009
 Zonal Separation as determined by CAF statutes

Group stage

Tie-breaking criteria
Where two or more teams end the group stage with the same number of points, their ranking is determined by the following criteria:
 points earned in the matches between the teams concerned;
 goal difference in the matches between the teams concerned;
 number of goals scored in the group matches between the teams concerned;
 number of away goals scored in the matches between the teams concerned;
 goal difference in all group matches;
 number of goals scored in all group matches;
 Yellow and red cards
 drawing of lots by the organizing committee.

All times are in local, East Africa Time (UTC+03:00).

Group A

Group B

Group C

Group D

Knockout phase

All times are in local, East Africa Time (UTC+03:00).

Quarter-finals

Semi-finals

Third Place Playoff

Final

Scorers
3 goals

 El Arbi Hillel Soudani
 Myron Shongwe
 Mudather Karika
 Zouheir Dhaouadi
 Salema Gasdaoui

2 goals

 Abdelmoumene Djabou
 Love
 Jerry Nelson Pitty Djoué
 Bheki Leonard Shabangu
 Oussama Darragi

1 goal

 Adel Maïza
 Hocine Metref
 Kali
 Osório Carvalho
 Ousmaïla Baba
 Jean Paul Ekane Ngah
 Joseph Julien Momasso
 Arnaud Monkam Guekam
 Geremi Sagong
 Mulota Kabangu
 Dioko Kaluyituka
 Matondo Salakiaku
 Zoumana Koné
 Kesse Jean-Paul Mangoua
 Jean Ulrich Bembangoye
 Johan Diderot Lengoualama
 Coomson Daniel Larbi
 Alou Bagayoko
 Abdelkader Adamou Tiemou
 Tukur Gambo
 Sidibe Issa Modibo
 Jean Baptiste Mugiraneza
 Jacques Tuyisenge
 Mohamed Niang Diop
 Moustapha Kassé
 Nhlakanipho Already Mkhwanazi
 Bakri Al-Madina
 Saif Eldin Ali Idris Farah
 Khaled Korbi
 Youssef Msakni
 Mejdi Traoui
 Juma Sadam Ibrahim
 Archford Gutu
 Norman Maroto

References

External links
 African Championship of Nations
 Schedule & Results

 
African Nations Championship
Nations Championship
International association football competitions hosted by Sudan
African Nations Championship, 2011
African Nations Championship